Sir Albert Spicer, 1st Baronet PC (16 March 1847 – 20 December 1934) was an English businessman and Liberal Party politician.

He was born in Brixton, London, the son of James Spicer D.L. of Alton, Hampshire (1807–1888), a wealthy paper merchant and a well-known congregationalist, and Louisa Edwards (1813–1892), daughter of Evan Edwards and Mary Ann Johnson. He was the sixth child in a family of ten, with three brothers and six sisters; he was the second son, after his brother James (great-grandfather of the Labour MP Harriet Harman).

When his father died in 1888, Albert inherited the paper company James Spicer & Sons (since 1922 Spicers Ltd) with his brother James, transforming it into the largest and most productive paper company in the world.

On 6 March 1879, he married Jessie Stewart Dykes, daughter of David Dykes and his wife Janet Buxton. They had eleven children, three boys and eight girls: Albert, Marion, Bertha, Grace, Stewart Dykes, Janet, Lancelot, Gwendoline Elaine, Eva, Olga and Ursula. He was created a Baronet in 1906, and served as Member of Parliament for the Monmouth Boroughs from 1892 to 1900, and for Hackney Central from 1906 to 1918. He was a J.P. for Essex and was appointed as a Privy Councillor in 1912.

He died aged 87 on 20 December 1934 at 24 Palace Road, Bayswater, London, and was cremated in Golders Green Crematorium on 21 December 1934. His wife had predeceased him. His title was inherited by his first son Albert, then, on his death in 1966, Stewart Dykes inherited the title. The paper trade was taken over by his son Lancelot Dykes Spicer (1893–1979).

Sources

References

External links 
 

1847 births
1934 deaths
English businesspeople
Spicer, Sir Albert, 1st Baronet
Liberal Party (UK) MPs for English constituencies
Members of the Privy Council of the United Kingdom
UK MPs 1892–1895
UK MPs 1895–1900
UK MPs 1910
UK MPs 1910–1918
Hackney Members of Parliament